Sophia Moermond (born 14 September 1968) is an Australian politician. She was elected to the Western Australian Legislative Council at the 2021 state election, representing Legalise Cannabis WA.

Early life
Moermond was born in Rotterdam on 14 September 1968. She moved to South Africa with her parents in 1972, returning to the Netherlands four years later. The family immigrated to Australia in 1983, settling in Heathridge, Western Australia. She attended Ocean Reef Senior High School, then returned to the Netherlands to study nursing. She graduated in 1991 and returned to Australia.

Career
Prior to entering politics, Moermond was a practising naturopath and Chinese medicine practitioner, based in Perth.  She also worked as an educator in the corporate sector.

Moermond studied at Perth Academy of Natural Therapies, having initially trained as a registered nurse at the Anna Reynvaan School of Nursing in Amsterdam. She moved to Western Australia with her parents in 1983, and has an active interest in health, the environment, women's rights, and animal welfare.

Politics
At the 2021 Western Australian state election, Moermond was elected to the Western Australian Legislative Council as a member for Legalise Cannabis WA in the South West Region.

Political positions
Moermond has described COVID-19 vaccine mandates as "medical apartheid" and has warned that they will end in "violence". In February 2022 she was suspended for some time from parliament under rules requiring MPs to present a digital identification certificate from Medicare highlighting their COVID-19 vaccination status (exempt or not)
.

References 

Living people
Members of the Western Australian Legislative Council
Legalise Cannabis Western Australia Party members of the Parliament of Western Australia
21st-century Australian politicians
Women members of the Western Australian Legislative Council
1968 births
Naturopaths
Dutch emigrants to Australia
Australian nurses
People from Rotterdam
21st-century Australian women politicians